The L. Fay Shepard House, near Jerome, Idaho, is a lava rock structure built in 1919. It was listed on the National Register of Historic Places in 1983.

The house was deemed "significant as an example of its vernacular house style. It is a good example of modest homes built in rural areas in the area of this nomination in the 1910s. It was built in 1919 for farmer L. Fay Shepard. The rocks came from the property and from the nearby Snake River Canyon edge."

References

Houses on the National Register of Historic Places in Idaho
Houses completed in 1919
Jerome County, Idaho
Lava rock buildings and structures